Warrick Maxwell Darling (born 1 May 1957), known as Rick Darling, is a former Australian Test cricketer.

His tendency to play the cut and hook shots provided much entertainment, but also meant that he was inconsistent and error-prone. It has been said that the introduction of the batting helmet saved Darling's life several times, but also gave him extra confidence to play his favoured shots. Darling's early Test career was also characterised by his opening partnerships with Graeme Wood, the pair christened the "Kamikaze Kids" due to their often disastrous running between the wickets, which saw one of the pair dismissed run out in one innings of each of their four Tests together.

Early life
Darling is the great-nephew of Joe Darling, and learnt to play cricket at his family's home at Ramco on the Murray River. He started playing for the Salisbury Cricket Club in the Adelaide district competition in 1970–71.

He was picked for South Australia Colts in 1974–75, scoring 67 against Victoria, 105 against Victoria, 48 against the West Indies and 45 against WA.

1975–76: First Class Debut
Darling started his first-class career in 1975–76 with South Australia. He made his debut against Queensland, batting at number 6, being run out for 5. (Darling would later become notorious for being involved in run outs throughout his career.) He then made 26 and 48 against Victoria, helping South Australia win the game. He scored 2 against the touring West Indians. A second innings of 29 helped guide South Australia to victory against Western Australia. He also made 2 and 32 against WA, 1 and 41 against Victoria and 12 against NSW. South Australia won the Sheffield Shield that year.

1976–77
Darling's Sheffield Shield scores for the 1976–77 season were 2 and 14, 0 and 25, 3 and 64. He made his initial first class century with 107 against Victoria. Then made 1 and 39, 22 and 4 and 7.

Darling made his one-day debut in the Gillette Cup quarter finals but only scored one.

Test player

1977–78
Darling was given his chance in the Australian Test team through the defection of several players to World Series Cricket in 1977.

At the beginning of the 1977–78 season he was 12th man for South Australia against the Indian team. He got back into the team and scored runs, playing particularly well against Western Australia, making 45 and 100.

He made 101 against Tasmania in a one-day game, which saw him come into discussions about possibly opening for Australia. His other knocks were 0 and 43 against Victoria and 39 and 15 against WA.

Australia had struggled to find a consistent opening partner during the first four tests. Darling was selected for the fifth test and subsequent tour of the West Indies. Also selected was Graeme Wood and it was thought these two could make an ideal combination, although Wood was only 21 and Darling just 20.

Test debut
Australia's gamble on Wood and Darling made dividends with the two of them putting on 89 for the first wicket, Australia's best opening partnership of the series. Darling made 65. He followed his up with 56 in the second innings, helping Australia win the game.

West Indies tour
Darling began the West Indies tour well, scoring 26 and 35 against Leeward Islands then 105 and 43 against Trinidad and Tobago.

He missed the first test due to injury, but recovered and made 62 against Barbados.

He made 8 in the first ODI but 21 in the second.

Darling was picked for the second test but failed twice, making 4 and 8. A knock of 123 against Guyana restored his confidence but he failed twice again in the third test, making 15 and 0.

Darling made 12 and 36 against the Windward Islands (doubling as wicketkeeper) and failed again in the fourth test, making 10 and 6. According to one report "Darling has developed an unfortunate habit of committing himself to the front foot, always looking to work the ball on the leg side. Yesterday he was bowled when he moved too far inside the line to glance and left his leg stump exposed."

Darling had made 43 runs in six test innings. He was dropped from the team for the fifth test, being replaced by David Ogilvie. Bob Simpson said he would have preferred a specialist opener "but we couldn't really persevere with Rick." Australia came close to winning the game before the crowd rioted and the match ended in a draw.

Darling did finish the tour however with 75 against Bermuda Counties. However it had been a disappointing tour for Darling, who now found his position in the Australian side in doubt.

1978–79 Ashes
Darling began the 1978–79 season failing twice for South Australia against the touring English team, making 17 and 1. He then made 39 against Tasmania.

He was omitted for the first test side with Australia using Wood and Gary Cosier as openers. They failed to put on a strong opening stand and when Darling scored 85 and 82 against NSW he was recalled for the second test, with Cosier dropped down the order. "

"I'm happy that we now have two experienced opening batsmen in Wood and Rick Darling, and I am confident that they will be able to give us a sound start,"" said captain Graham Yallop.

This did not turn out to be the case with Darling only scoring 25 (run out) and 5. He made 19 and 41 for South Australia against England.

Darling and Wood put on two 50-plus opening stands in the third test, helping Australia to a rare victory. Darling made 33 (run out) and 21.

Darling's finest Test innings was 91 against England at Sydney in the 4th Test. He helped Australia to a first innings lead but they collapsed in the second innings (Darling made 13; it was Wood's turn to be run out) and lost badly.

Darling was injured in a fielding mishap. "I just could not hold a bat", he said. "Frankly I don't think I'll be able to play again for at least a week". This saw him omitted for a one-day match against England (he was replaced by Andrew Hilditch). However he kept his place for the fifth test.

It was the next match for which Darling is perhaps most famous though, as he was struck on the chest by a delivery that lifted viciously from fast bowler Bob Willis. The blow caused Darling's chewing gum to become lodged in his throat, and he collapsed on the pitch, not breathing. English spinner John Emburey was first on the scene, and thumped Darling on the chest, allowing him to breathe again. Umpire Max O'Connell then provided mouth-to-mouth resuscitation, and Darling was taken off the field:
"All I can remember is, Bob Willis had this big inswinging, in-dipping action", Darling says. "The ball was pitched well outside off stump was the last thing I remember. Once it swung in, it also cut in further. I was caught in no man's land. I was sort of caught out of position, and hit in the chest. Unfortunately, at the time, I was chewing a chewy, and I swallowed my tongue and chewy as well. That caused me to black out."
He returned to the crease the following day, but could only make 15 runs.  Darling:
I knew the Englishmen would test me out as soon as I walked out. Ian Botham. Bob Willis. I remember facing Ian Botham when I went out there, and he did test me out. Fortunately enough I did hook him for a six, but I must admit it was more of a top edge. Adelaide Oval had quite short square boundaries, and it managed to clear them for a six. Of course he tested me out a few more times.
Darling made 9 in the second innings and Australia fell to a crushing 205-run loss, which allowed England to retain The Ashes.

English captain Mike Brearley attributed his team's success to its ability to get through the Australian batting order. "The biggest problem is to break the opening pair. Rick Darling and Graeme Wood", he said. "At times they have played very well, but we have found that once we can get one of them cheaply we have been able to dismiss numbers three, four and five with the new ball."

Darling was dropped for the sixth test in favour of Hilditch. He kept his place in the one day side but performed poorly.

He made 36 against NSW, 17 and 22 against Queensland., and 1 and 34 against WA.

Pakistan Series
He was recalled to the Australian side for the second test against Pakistan, replacing Graeme Wood. "Darling has been unlucky throughout the series", said Yallop. Darling responded with 79 for South Australia against Pakistan.

Darling had an excellent return to the test side, fielding brilliantly and scoring 75 in the first innings, putting on 96 with Hilditch. A similar knock of 79 in the second innings helped Australia win and Darling won the man of the match award.

It was reported that World Series Cricket officials had offered Darling a contract for the upcoming 1979/80 WSC season (which did not eventuate). Darling had been unemployed for six months but went to work for Hindmarsh Building Society, sponsors of the South Australian side.

Darling was described as one of the most nervous first-class cricketers, often biting his fingernails before he went out to bat.

1979 World Cup
Darling was selected to play for Australia in the 1979 World Cup. He made 60 in a warm up game against New Zealand but failed to impress in the official games, with scores of 25 (against England), 13 (against Pakistan) and 13 (against Canada).

1979 India tour
Darling was selected for Australia's tour of India in 1979. He fell ill with a stomach ailment early in the tour. Then later he was hit in the face while fielding, meaning he only batted once in the lead up games, making 34 against North Zone. Eventually Darling was ruled unfit and Wood took his place.

Darling returned to the team for the second test, replacing Dav Whatmore but was dismissed cheaply for 7 in the first innings, and did not bat in the second innings due to illness.

82 in a tour game against Central Zone restored his confidence. In the third test he was injured again while fielding. Darling batted down the order and scored a fighting 59. He opened in the second innings and scored only 4.

According to a contemporary report, "In a team of complex characters, Darling is perhaps the most complex. He is a tremendously talented batsman dragged back by acute nervousness. Sometimes he gets so worked up thinking about batting that he has to run off the field and be physically ill in the dressing room. Darling's problem has always been with him. It is the main reason why he has been made into an opener, when his technique and attacking flair make him more suited to a position down the order."

Darling made 27 and 3 against West Zone and was dismissed cheaply twice in the fourth test, 19 and 7. He was dropped down the order for the fifth and sixth tests. In the fifth he made 39 and 7; in the 6th it was 16 and 0.

In the final Test, Darling was hit on the head attempting a hook shot from a Kapil Dev bouncer, and was carried off the field and forced to retire hurt with no score to his name. His head split open, Darling was taken to hospital, where, according to Bob Merriman, the doctors refused to stitch him up until he signed an autograph for them. (Darling later said this was untrue.)

Post-WSC career

1979–80
Darling began the 1979–80 season superbly with 88 against the West Indies for South Australia.

"I can see that if I want to get back in the Test side I will have to concentrate on opening because there seems to be plenty of middle-order batsmen", he said. However, when picked to play against the West Indies for a Tasmanian Invitational XI he made 1; then when he asked to bat down the order he was dismissed for 15. Against NSW he made 42 and 10 then impressed against England with 45 and 75 not out and 50 against WA.

Darling was unable to force his way back into the test team but was selected to play for Australia in the one day side. He made 20.

He followed this with 134 against Queensland in a Sheffield Shield game, his fifth first class century. He was injured while fielding later in the season.

1980–81
Darling began the next summer well with 81 against Tasmania. He suffered more injury problems hurting his thigh in a game against Western Australia. Highlights of the summer included 61 against India, 65 against Victoria and 50, plus 51 in a McDonald's Cup semi final.

1981–82: Return to the national side
Darling had an excellent season in 1981–82. He made 72 against NSW and 88 against the West Indies. When Graham Yallop fell injured, Darling was recalled to the Australian one day team. He made 41 against Pakistan, featuring in another run out with Graeme Wood, but being Australia's second top scorer.

Later innings included 5 against the West Indies, 35 against Pakistan (where Darling was run out again) and 74 against Pakistan (Australia's top score, Darling run out again, Pakistan won). He had a run of low scores – 7 against the West Indies, 5 (run out) against Pakistan and 20 against the West Indies. He made 132 and 58 not out for South Australia against Pakistan. However he was dropped from the one day team.

Darling made 134 against Victoria which saw him back in the one day team. "Darling is chancy with the bat but the selectors are banking on his coming good in their moment of need", wrote the Canberra Times. "He now has 659 runs in first-class cricket this season and brings the bonus of brilliant cover fielding."

He made a useful 34 against the West Indies, helping Australia to a victory. He made 14 in the next game then was dropped again from the squad in favour of David Hookes. He and Hookes were placed on standby for the Australian team for the Test in Adelaide against West Indies in case Greg Chappell and Kim Hughes were unable to field.

Other notable innings that year included 88 and 52 against Tasmania, and 121 against West Australia. He also made a half century in the McDonald's Cup semi final. South Australia won the Sheffield Shield at the end of the season. Darling's batting was a crucial part of the state's success. His omission from the 1982 tour of Pakistan surprised several observers.

1982–83: Serious injury
Darling took some time to get going form-wise at the start of the 1982–83 season. He was beginning to find form with 98 against NSW. His next match was against Queensland; Darling was 17 when he was hit on the face by a delivery from John Maguire. He suffered bleeding in the eye and lacerations and had to spend several days in hospital. He returned to the team two months later. He played one game, making 15 and 4, then declared himself unavailable due to personal commitments. Darling later recalled:
The one that finished my career was when I got hit in my eye by John Maguire from Queensland...He got one to really rear up, and I got back to hook and it went between the visor and the top part of the helmet and smashed in my eye. That finished me. After that, I didn't want to be there. I thought of other things I wanted to do in life. Even though I continued playing on in Shield for two or three years, I just didn't want to be there.

1983–84 and later seasons
During the 1983–84 summer he returned to the South Australian side, batting down the order. He scored 58 against Pakistan but in his next game he clashed with South Australian captain David Hookes who wanted Darling to open in the absence of Wayne Phillips, but Darling wanted to bat down the order. Hookes responded by making Darling come in at number eight. Darling withdrew for the rest of the season as a result.

Darling returned for the 1984/85 season, claiming the dispute had been settled. He scored 100 in a state trial game but was omitted from the initial state squad. He managed to force his way back into the side for several games that summer, making 113 runs at 37 with a highest score of 58.

In 1985–86 Darling scored a century against the touring Indians. It was his best innings of the season, in which Darling made 350 runs at an average of 31. Another highlight was 97 against NSW and 60 against NSW.

Summary
Overall, he played 98 first-class games, finishing with a batting average of 35.83. Darling was renowned for being one of the country's best cover fieldsmen of his time.

In 2014 he recalled that he was injured several times:
Probably the ones that hit me in the head later on in my career were a lot more detrimental than the one that hit me in the chest. The fact that it has caused long-term effects – I was probably hit badly in the head three or four times in my career. To the point where it has now caused what they call post-traumatic epilepsy. It's not a full-blown epilepsy attack, but more of a dizzy spell, sort of a blackout type. Only in the last 12 months has this been identified. Medication has fixed it up.

Retirement
In 2014 Darling was working as a gardener at a retirement home.

Trivia
 Darling holds the record of eight consecutive scores over 50 in the Ribblesdale League, obtained whilst playing for Whalley Cricket Club.

Footnotes
 – 
 – 
 – 
 – 
 –

References

External links
 

1957 births
Australia One Day International cricketers
Australia Test cricketers
Living people
South Australia cricketers
Australian cricketers
Cricketers from South Australia